William Lee (c. 17501810), also known as Billy or Will Lee, was an American slave and personal assistant of George Washington. He was the only one of Washington's slaves who was freed immediately by Washington's will. Because he served by Washington's side throughout the American Revolutionary War and was sometimes depicted next to Washington in paintings, Lee was one of the most publicized African-Americans of his time.

Early life

Born c. 1750, Lee was purchased on May 27, 1768, when he was just a teenager, by George Washington, as described in Washington's account book as Mulatto Will, from the estate of the late Colonel John Lee of Westmoreland County, Virginia for sixty-one pounds and fifteen shillings. William kept the surname "Lee" from his previous owner. Also purchased at the time was William's brother Frank as well as two other slaves. Washington paid high prices for William and Frank, as they were to be household slaves, rather than field slaves. William and Frank were often chosen to serve as domestic servants. Frank became Washington's butler at Mount Vernon, and William served in a variety of roles, including Washington's valet or manservant. As the valet, Lee performed chores such as brushing Washington's long hair and tying it behind his head.

Huntsman 

Washington was a frequent fox hunter, and Lee became his huntsman and was in charge of the hounds or dogs, a role that required expert horsemanship and blowing horn calls, or signals, on a hunting horn. In his memoirs, Washington's step-grandson, George Washington Parke Custis, described Lee during a hunt:Will, the huntsman, better known in Revolutionary lore as Billy, rode a horse called Chinkling, a surprising leaper, and made very much like its rider, low, but sturdy, and of great bone and muscle. Will had but one order, which was to keep with the hounds; and, mounted on Chinkling, a French horn at his back, throwing himself almost at length on the animal, with his spur in flank, this fearless horseman would rush, at full speed, through brake or tangled wood, in a style at which modern huntsmen would stand aghast.The hunting horn aspect of William Lee's life and other Huntsmen of African and Creole descent are largely undocumented, however they are acknowledged as "exploited for the benefit of their indentures and enslavers."

Revolutionary War
Before the Revolutionary War, Lee often traveled with Washington to the House of Burgesses in Williamsburg, or on journeys such as a surveying expedition to the Ohio Valley in 1770 and to the First Continental Congress in Philadelphia in 1774. Lee served at Washington's side throughout the eight years of the Revolutionary War, including the winter at Valley Forge and at the siege of Yorktown.

According to the historian Fritz Hirschfeld, Lee "rode alongside Washington in the thick of battle, ready to hand over to the general a spare horse or his telescope or whatever else might be needed."

Later life
Lee's wife was Margaret Thomas Lee, a free African-American from Philadelphia who had worked as a servant in Washington's headquarters during the war. Slave marriages were not recognized by Virginian law, but in 1784, at the couple's request, Washington tried to arrange having Margaret move to Mount Vernon to live with her husband. Whether or not she ever came to Mount Vernon is unknown.

In 1785, Lee injured a knee on an expedition for Washington. Three years later, while he went to the post office in Alexandria, he fell and injured his other knee, which rendered him seriously disabled. After Washington was elected president in 1789, Lee attempted to make the journey to New York City for Washington's first inauguration but had to be left in Philadelphia for medical treatment. He was attended by several physicians, who made a steel brace for his knee, which allowed him to join Washington's presidential household. Frank's nephew, Christopher Sheels, assisted Lee in New York City and took over Lee's duties in 1790 at the Philadelphia President's House.

Even after Washington's 1797 retirement, Lee's disabilities prevented him from continuing his previous duties, and he spent the last years of his life as a shoemaker at Mount Vernon and struggled with alcoholism. The American Revolutionary War veterans who visited Mount Vernon often stopped to reminisce with Lee about the war.

When Washington died in 1799, he freed Lee in his will and cited "his faithful services during the Revolutionary War." Lee was the only one of Washington's 124 slaves to be freed outright in his will. According to the terms of Washington's will, his remaining slaves were to be freed upon the death of his wife, Martha Washington. Lee was given a pension of thirty dollars a year for the rest of his life and the option to remain at Mount Vernon, which he chose; he was buried there.

Legacy
"If Billy Lee had been a white man," wrote the historian Fritz Hirschfeld, "he would have had an honored place in American history because of his close proximity to George Washington during the most exciting periods of his career. But because he was a black servant, a humble slave, he has been virtually ignored by both black and white historians and biographers."

Portrayals
Lee is portrayed by Ron Canada in the 1984 CBS miniseries George Washington.
Lee is portrayed by Gentry White in the AMC series Turn: Washington's Spies (2014–2017).  He is featured prominently in season-2 episode "Valley Forge."
Hainsley Lloyd Bennett portrays Lee in the 2020 miniseries Washington.

See also
 List of enslaved people of Mount Vernon
 George Washington and slavery
 Samuel Osgood House – First Presidential Mansion.
 Alexander Macomb House – Second Presidential Mansion.
 President's House (Philadelphia) – Third Presidential Mansion.
 List of slaves

Bibliography
Hirschfeld, Fritz. George Washington and Slavery: A Documentary Portrayal. University of Missouri Press, 1997.
Wiencek, Henry. An Imperfect God: George Washington, His Slaves, and the Creation of America. New York: Farrar, Straus and Giroux, 2003.

Notes

References

External links
"William (Billy) Lee", from the Mount Vernon Ladies Association website
Last Will and Testament of George Washington
"Colonel Washington and Me"

1750 births
1828 deaths
African Americans in the American Revolution
People of Virginia in the American Revolution
Mount Vernon slaves
Virginia colonial people
Burials at Mount Vernon